Salomatin is a rural locality (a khutor) in Filonovskoye Rural Settlement, Novoanninsky District, Volgograd Oblast, Russia. The population was 374 as of 2010. There are 9 streets.

Geography 
Salomatin is located on the Khopyorsko-Buzulukskaya Plain, on the bank of the Buzuluk River, 22 km northeast of Novoanninsky (the district's administrative centre) by road. Rozhnovsky is the nearest rural locality.

References 

Rural localities in Novoanninsky District